Luton Town Football Club is an English football club based in Luton, Bedfordshire, which competes in the Championship, the second tier of English football, for the 2020–21 season. Formed in 1885 as the product of a merger, Luton Town became the first professional team in the south of England six years later and joined the Football League in 1897. After leaving the League in 1900 because of financial difficulties, Luton Town settled at their Kenilworth Road ground in 1905 and competed in the Southern League until 1920, when the club rejoined the Football League. The team was relegated to the Football Conference in 2009, after 89 consecutive years of League membership, following a 30-point deduction imposed by the football authorities. Five seasons later, the club won promotion back to the Football League.

Luton Town's first team has competed in a number of nationally contested leagues, and its record against each club faced in these competitions is listed below. The team that the club has met most in league competition is Queens Park Rangers, against whom Luton Town have contested 117 league matches; having lost 46 of these matches, the side has lost more league games to Queens Park Rangers than to any other club. The club against whom Luton Town have recorded the most league victories is Watford, whom the Bedfordshire club have beaten 45 times out of 103 league meetings. Luton have drawn more matches with Millwall than with any other club; out of the 107 league matches between the two teams, 34 have finished without a winner.

Key
The records include the results of matches played in the Southern Football League (from 1894 to 1896, and then again from 1900 to 1920), the United League (from 1896 to 1897), the Football League (from 1897 to 1900, 1920 to 2009 and then again from 2014 to the present day) and the Football Conference (from 2009 to 2014). Play-off matches are not included.
For simplicity, present-day names are used throughout: for example, results against Newton Heath, Millwall Athletic and Woolwich Arsenal are integrated into the records against Manchester United, Millwall and Arsenal, respectively.
The season given as the "first" denotes the season in which Luton Town first played a league match against that team.
The season given as the "last" designates the most recent season to have included a league match between Luton Town and that side. Current divisional rivals that the club has never met in the league have a blank entry, indicating that the first league meeting of the season has not yet taken place.
  Teams with this background and symbol in the "Club" column are current divisional rivals of Luton Town.
  Clubs with this background and symbol in the "Club" column are defunct.
P = matches played; W = matches won; D = matches drawn; L = matches lost; Win% = percentage of total matches won

All-time league record
Statistics are correct as of match played 6 February 2021.

a  Results in the Southern Football League, the United League and the Football League until 1997 sourced to Bailey, The Definitive Luton Town F.C. This list excludes games played in the abandoned 1939–40 season. Results in the Football League post-1997 and the Football Conference sourced to Soccerbase.

Footnotes

A.  Record against Bournemouth & Boscombe Athletic included
B.  Record against Woolwich Arsenal included
C.  Record against Small Heath included; record against Birmingham included
D.  Record against Chester (1885) included
E.  Record against New Brompton included
F.  Record against Glossop included
G.  Record against Kettering included
H.  Record against Leicester Fosse included
I.  Record against Clapton Orient included; record against Orient included
J.  Record against Newton Heath included
K.  Record against Millwall Athletic included
L.  Record against Burslem Port Vale included
M.  Record against Southampton St. Mary's included
N.  Record against Stevenage Borough included
O.  Record against Stoke included
P.  Record against Swansea Town included
Q.  Record against Treharris included

References
General

Specific

League Record By Opponent
Luton Town